The 1997–98 Elitserien was the 64th season of the top division of Swedish handball. 12 teams competed in the league. The league was split into an autumn league and a spring league. The eight highest placed teams in the autumn league qualified for the spring league. Redbergslids IK won the regular season and also won the playoffs to claim their 17th Swedish title.

League tables

Autumn

Spring

Playoffs

Quarterfinals
 HK Drott–HP Warta 21–17
 HP Warta–HK Drott 25–24
 HK Drott–HP Warta 26–17
HK Drott won series 2–1

IFK Skövde–Guif 26–27
Guif–IFK Skövde 33–34
IFK Skövde–Guif 40–24
IFK Skövde won series 2–1

Semifinals
Redbergslids IK–IFK Skövde 29–14
IFK Skövde–Redbergslids IK 26–30
Redbergslids IK won series 2–0

Lugi-HK Drott 25–31
HK Drott-Lugi 33–27
HK Drott won series 2–0

Finals
 Redbergslids IK–HK Drott 33–19
 HK Drott–Redbergslids IK 25–22
 Redbergslids IK–HK Drott 29–17
 HK Drott–Redbergslids IK 24–25
Redbergslids IK won series 3–1

References 

Swedish handball competitions